Haemophilus influenzae (formerly called Pfeiffer's bacillus or Bacillus influenzae) is a Gram-negative, non-motile, coccobacillary, facultatively anaerobic, capnophilic pathogenic bacterium of the family Pasteurellaceae. The bacteria are mesophilic and grow best at temperatures between 35 and 37℃.

H. influenzae was first explained in 1893  by Richard Pfeiffer during an influenza pandemic when he incorrectly described Haemophilus influenzae as the causative microbe, which is why the bacteria retain the name "influenza". H. influenzae is responsible for a wide range of localized and invasive infections, typically in infants and children, including pneumonia, meningitis, or bloodstream infections. Treatment consists of antibiotics, however H. influenzae is often resistant to the penicillin family but amoxicillin/clavulanic acid can be used in mild cases. The recommended form of prevention of the type b form of H. influenzae is a series of the Hib vaccine and boosters, which are most often given under the age of 5, and sometimes in conjunction with other vaccines in the form of the DTaP-IPV/Hib vaccine.

This species was the first free-living microorganism to have its entire genome sequenced.

Serotypes
In 1930, two major categories of H. influenzae were defined: the unencapsulated strains and the encapsulated strains. Encapsulated strains were classified on the basis of their distinct capsular antigens. The six generally recognized types of encapsulated H. influenzae are: a, b, c, d, e, and f. H. Influenzae type b, also known as Hib, is the most common form, recognizable by its polyribosyl ribitol phosphate (PRP) capsule, and found mostly in children. Types a, e, and f have been isolated infrequently, while types d and c are rarely isolated. Unencapsulated strains are more genetically diverse than the encapsulated group. Unencapsulated strains are termed nontypable (NTHi) because they lack capsular serotypes; however, they can be classified by multilocus sequence typing. NTHi strains are considered to be part of the normal human flora in the upper and lower respiratory tract, genitals, and conjunctivae (mucous membranes of the eye).

Physiology

Structure 
H. Influenzae is a small Gram-negative bacterium, approximately 0.3 micrometer to 1 micrometer. Like other Gram-negative bacteria, H. influenzae has a thin peptidoglycan layer surrounded by an outer membrane containing lipopolysaccharide. Some types of H. influenzae contain a polysaccharide capsule around the outer membrane to aid in protection and colonization. The bacteria are pleomorphic, meaning the shape of the bacterium is variable, however it is typically coccobacillus or rod-shaped. H. Influenzae contains pili, which are specialized to adhere to the human nasopharynx. The H. Influenzae pili, unlike those of E. coli, resist unwinding, allowing for stronger adhesion to resist expulsion when coughing or sneezing. A minority of non-typeable, or unencapsulated, H. influenzae employ a variety of attachment techniques, such as pili, adhesins, or Hia and Hap proteins. Though the bacteria possess pili, they are not used for traditional movement or motility, and the bacterium is still considered to be non-motile.

The cell wall of H. influenzae bacterium contains various proteins, referred to as autotransporters, for adherence and colony formation. H. influenzae prefers to bind to mucus linings or non-ciliated epithelial cells, which is facilitated by Hap𝘴 autotransporters in the cell wall binding with unknown receptors within the epithelium. The Hap𝘴 autotransporters also facilitate the formation of microcolonies of the bacteria. These microcolonies are likely responsible for the formation of various biofilms within the body, such as those which are responsible for middle ear or lung infections.

Penicillin binding proteins 
Penicillin binding proteins (PBPs) contain penicillin binding domains are involved in peptidoglycan metabolism, which makes up the cell wall, to give bacterial cells rigidity. Beta-lactams are used in antibiotics that bind to PBPs, in order to target peptidoglycan synthesis. Some isolates of H. Influenzae have contained modified PBPs that resist beta-lactam action by producing beta-lactamases. This resistance is likely due to a N526K mutation, or R517H substitution in conjunction with another unknown mutation. The R517H substitution alone did not have a lower affinity for penicillin, and therefore cannot cause resistance alone. Beta-lactamase emergence in the 1970s caused the therapy for severe cases of H. influenzae to be changed from ampicillin to cephalosporins, however further resistance to cephalosporins has occurred due to changes in the transpeptidase domain of penicillin binding protein 3 (PBP3).

Diagnosis

Clinical features may include initial symptoms of an upper respiratory tract infection mimicking a viral infection, usually associated with low-grade fevers. This may progress to the lower respiratory tract within a few days, with features often resembling those of wheezy bronchitis. Sputum may be difficult to expectorate and is often grey or creamy in color. The cough may persist for weeks without appropriate treatment. Many cases are diagnosed after presenting chest infections that do not respond to penicillins or first-generation cephalosporins. A chest X-ray can identify alveolar consolidation.

Clinical diagnosis of invasive H. influenzae infection is typically confirmed by bacterial culture or latex particle agglutination tests or polymerase chain reaction tests on clinical samples obtained from a sterile body site. In this respect, H. influenzae cultured from the nasopharyngeal cavity or throat would not indicate H. influenzae disease, because these sites are colonized in disease-free individuals. However, H. influenzae isolated from cerebrospinal fluid or blood or joint fluid  would indicate H. influenzae infection.

Culture

Bacterial culture of H. influenzae is performed on agar plates, the preferable one being chocolate agar, with added X (hemin) and V (nicotinamide adenine dinucleotide) factors at 37 °C in a CO2-enriched incubator. The ideal CO2 concentration for the culture is ~5%. Blood agar growth is only achieved as a satellite phenomenon around other bacteria. Colonies of H. influenzae appear as convex, smooth, pale, grey, or transparent colonies.

Gram stained and microscopic observation of a specimen of H. influenzae will show Gram-negative coccobacillus. The cultured organism can be further characterized using catalase and oxidase tests, both of which should be positive. Further serological testing is necessary to distinguish the capsular polysaccharide and differentiate between H. influenzae b and nonencapsulated species.

Although highly specific, bacterial culture of H. influenzae lacks sensitivity. Use of antibiotics prior to sample collection greatly reduces the isolation rate by killing the bacteria before identification is possible. Recent work has shown that H.influenzae uses a highly specialized spectrum of nutrients where lactate is a preferred carbon source.

H. influenzae will grow in the hemolytic zone of Staphylococcus aureus on blood agar plates; the hemolysis of cells by S. aureus releases factor V which is needed for its growth. H. influenzae will not grow outside the hemolytic zone of S. aureus due to the lack of nutrients such as factor V in these areas.

Latex particle agglutination
The latex particle agglutination test (LAT)  is a more sensitive method to detect H. influenzae than is culture. Because the method relies on antigen rather than viable bacteria, the results are not disrupted by prior antibiotic use. It also has the added benefit of being much quicker than culture methods. However, antibiotic sensitivity testing is not possible with LAT alone, so a parallel culture is necessary.

Molecular methods
Polymerase chain reaction (PCR) assays have been proven to be more sensitive than either LAT or culture tests, and are highly specific. These PCR tests can be used for capsular typing of encapsulated H. influenzae strains.

Pathogenicity
H. influenzae is generally found within and upon the human body, but can also live on various dry, hard surfaces for up to 12 days.
Most strains of H. influenzae are opportunistic pathogens; that is, they usually live in their host without causing disease, but cause problems only when other factors (such as a viral infection, reduced immune function or chronically inflamed tissues, e.g. from allergies) create an opportunity. They infect the host by sticking to the host cell using trimeric autotransporter adhesins.

The pathogenesis of H. influenzae infections is not completely understood, although the presence of the polyribosyl ribitol phosphate (PRP) capsule in encapsulated type b (Hib), a serotype causing conditions such as epiglottitis, is known to be a major factor in virulence. Their capsule allows them to resist phagocytosis and complement-mediated lysis in the nonimmune host. The unencapsulated strains are almost always less invasive; however, they can produce an inflammatory response in humans, which can lead to many symptoms. Vaccination with Hib conjugate vaccine is effective in preventing Hib infection but does not prevent infection with NTHi strains.

Haemophilus influenzae can cause respiratory tract infections including pneumonia, otitis media, epiglottitis (swelling in the throat), eye infections and bloodstream infection, meningitis. It can also cause cellulitis (skin infection) and infectious arthritis (inflammation of the joint).

Haemophilus influenzae type b (Hib) infection

Naturally acquired disease caused by H. influenzae seems to occur in humans only. In healthy children under the age of 5, H. influenzae type b was responsible for more than 80% of aggressive infections, before the introduction of the [Hib] vaccine. In infants and young children, H. influenzae type b (Hib) causes bacteremia, pneumonia, epiglottitis and acute bacterial meningitis. On occasion, it causes cellulitis, osteomyelitis, and infectious arthritis. It is one cause of neonatal infection.

Due to routine use of the Hib vaccine in the U.S. since 1990, the incidence of invasive Hib disease has decreased to 1.3/100,000 in children. However, Hib remains a major cause of lower respiratory tract infections in infants and children in developing countries where the vaccine is not widely used. Unencapsulated H. influenzae strains are unaffected by the Hib vaccine and cause ear infections (otitis media), eye infections (conjunctivitis), and sinusitis in children, and are associated with pneumonia.

Haemophilus influenzae colonization 
Many microbes colonize within a host organism. Colonization occurs when a microorganism continues to multiply within the host, without interaction, causing no visible signs of illness or infection. Haemophilus influenzae colonizes differently in adults than it does young children. Because this bacterium colonizes more rapidly in young children, they are capable of carrying more than one strain of the same bacterium. Once in the adult stage of life, a human is likely to only be carrying one strain as this bacterium does not colonize as aggressively in adults. Nearly all infants will undergo colonization of this bacteria within their first year of life.

Treatment
Some strains of Haemophilus influenzae produce beta-lactamases, and are also able to modify its penicillin-binding proteins, so the bacteria have gained resistance to the penicillin family of antibiotics. In severe cases, cefotaxime and ceftriaxone delivered directly into the bloodstream are the elected antibiotics, and, for the less severe cases, an association of ampicillin and sulbactam, cephalosporins of the second and third generation, or fluoroquinolones are preferred. (Fluoroquinolone-resistant Haemophilus influenzae have been observed.)

Macrolides and fluoroquinolones have activity against non-typeable H. influenzae and could be used in patients with a history of allergy to beta-lactam antibiotics. However, macrolide resistance has also been observed.

Serious and chronic complications
The serious complications of HiB are brain damage, hearing loss, and even death. This is commonly associated with HiB but however the Hi non-typable doesn't often cause serious conditions but it has more risks to a chronic infection because it has the ability to change its surface antigens. Chronic infections are usually not as serious than acute infections.

There are a few other possible diseases and conditions that can arise from the Haemophilus influenzae depending on the areas that they exist in within the human body. This bacterium can exist in the nasal passages (especially the nasopharynx), the ear canal, and the lungs. The bacterium's presence in these areas can lead to some conditions such as otitis media (which is the inflammation of the middle ear), chronic obstructive pulmonary disorder, which causes decreased air flow to the lungs, epiglotitis (which is the swelling of the epiglottis) and asthma which can become severe.

Metabolism 
H. influenzae uses the Embden–Meyerhof–Parnas (EMP) pathway for glycolysis and the pentose phosphate pathway, which is anabolic rather than catabolic. The citric acid cycle is incomplete and lacks several enzymes that are found in a fully functioning cycle. This partially functional  cycle is not unique to the H. influenzae. The enzymes missing from the TCA cycle are citrate synthase, aconitate hydratase, and isocitrate dehydrogenase.  Haemophilus influenzae has been found in both aerobic, and anaerobic environments, as well as environments with different pH's.

Prevention 

Effective vaccines for Haemophilus influenzae serotype b have been available since the early 1990s, and are recommended for children under age 5 and asplenic patients. The World Health Organization recommends a pentavalent vaccine, combining vaccines against diphtheria, tetanus, pertussis, hepatitis B and Hib. There is not yet sufficient evidence on how effective this pentavalent vaccine is in relation to the individual vaccines.

Hib vaccines cost about seven times the total cost of vaccines against measles, polio, tuberculosis, diphtheria, tetanus, and pertussis. Consequently, whereas 92% of the populations of developed countries were vaccinated against Hib as of 2003, vaccination coverage was 42% for developing countries, and only 8% for least-developed countries.

The Hib vaccines do not provide cross-protection to any other Haemophilus influenzae serotypes like Hia, Hic, Hid, Hie or Hif.

An oral vaccination has been developed for non-typeable Haemophilus influenzae (NTHi) for patients with chronic bronchitis but it has not shown to be effective in reducing the number and severity of COPD exacerbations. However, there is no effective vaccine for the other types of capsulated Haemophilus inflenzae or Haemophilus inflenzae nontypeable.

Genome
H. influenzae was the first free-living organism to have its entire genome sequenced. Completed by Craig Venter and his team at The Institute for Genomic Research, now part of the J. Craig Venter Institute.  Haemophilus was chosen because one of the project leaders, Nobel laureate Hamilton Smith, had been working on it for decades and was able to provide high-quality DNA libraries. The sequencing method used was whole-genome shotgun, which was completed and published in Science in 1995.

The genome of strain Rd KW20 consists of 1,830,138 base pairs of DNA in a single circular chromosome that contains 1604 protein-coding genes, 117 pseudogenes, 57 tRNA genes, and 23 other RNA genes. About 90% of the genes have homologs in E. coli, another gamma-proteobacterium. In fact, the similarity between genes of the two species ranges from 18% to 98% protein sequence identity, with the majority sharing 40-80% of their amino acids (with an average of 59%).

Conjugative plasmids (DNA molecules that are capable of horizontal transfer between different species of bacteria) can frequently be found in H. influenzae. It is common that the F+ plasmid of a competent Escherichia coli bacterium conjugates into the H. influenzae bacterium, which then allows the plasmid to transfer among H. influenzae strands via conjugation.

Likely protective role of transformation
Unencapsulated H. influenzae is often observed in the airways of patients with chronic obstructive pulmonary disease (COPD). Neutrophils are also observed in large numbers in sputum from patients with COPD. The neutrophils phagocytize H. influenzae, thereby activating an oxidative respiratory burst. However instead of killing the bacteria the neutrophils are themselves killed (though such an oxidative burst likely causes DNA damage in the H. influenzae cells). Dearth of killing the bacteria appears to explain the persistence of infection in COPD.

H. influenzae mutants defective in the rec1 gene (a homolog of recA) are very sensitive to killing by the oxidizing agent hydrogen peroxide. This finding suggests that rec1 expression is important for H. influenzae survival under conditions of oxidative stress. Since it is a homolog of recA, rec1 likely plays a key role in recombinational repair of DNA damage. Thus H. influenzae may protect its genome against the reactive oxygen species produced by the host's phagocytic cells through recombinational repair of oxidative DNA damages. Recombinational repair of a damaged site of a chromosome requires, in addition to rec1, a second homologous undamaged DNA molecule. Individual H. influenzae cells are capable of taking up homologous DNA from other cells by the process of transformation. Transformation in H. influenzae involves at least 15 gene products, and is likely an adaptation for repairing DNA damage in the resident chromosome.

Vaccines that target unencapsulated H. influenzae serotypes are in development.

See also 

 Hattie Alexander
 Haemophilus influenzae cellulitis
 Haemophilus meningitis
 Maurice Hilleman
 Trimeric Autotransporter Adhesins (TAA)

References

External links 

 Hib information on the World Health Organization (WHO) site.
 Fact sheet on the Centers for Disease Control and Prevention (CDC) site.
 Hib Initiative—from Johns Hopkins University, London School of Hygiene & Tropical Medicine, CDC & WHO
 November 2nd: World Pneumonia Day Website
 
 
 Type strain of Haemophilus influenzae at BacDive –  the Bacterial Diversity Metadatabase

Bacteria described in 1917
Gram-negative bacteria
influenzae
Pneumonia
Capnophiles
Polysaccharide encapsulated bacteria
Vaccine-preventable diseases